Jaugilka (Jaugelka, Jaugėlka) is a village in Kėdainiai district municipality, in Kaunas County, in central Lithuania. According to the 2011 census, the village had a population of 1.

There are a wooden cross and a monumental stone.

Demography

Images

References

Villages in Kaunas County
Kėdainiai District Municipality